Bosl or Bösl  is a surname. Notable people with the surname include:

George Bosl (born 1948), American cancer researcher
Heinz Bosl (1946–1975), German ballet dancer
Wolfgang Bösl (born 1989), German Nordic combined skier

See also
Bose (surname)